Thesprotia infumata is a species of mantis found in Argentina, Bolivia, Brazil, and Paraguay.

References

Infumata
Mantodea of South America
Fauna of Argentina
Fauna of Bolivia
Insects of Brazil
Fauna of Paraguay
Insects of South America
Insects described in 1839